Harry Judson "Hank" Hardwick was an American football player and coach.  He was the 22nd head football coach at the United States Naval Academy in Annapolis, Maryland, serving for two seasons, from 1937 to 1938, and compiling a record of 8–7–3.

Head coaching record

References

Year of birth missing
Year of death missing
Navy Midshipmen football coaches
Navy Midshipmen football players
United States Navy officers